The first Jewish population in the region to be later known as Germany came with the Romans to the city now known as Cologne. A "Golden Age" in the first millennium saw the emergence of the Ashkenazi Jews, while the persecution and expulsion that followed the Crusades led to the creation of Yiddish and an overall shift eastwards. A change of status in the late Renaissance Era, combined with the Jewish Enlightenment, the Haskalah, meant that by the 1920s Germany had one of the most integrated Jewish populations in Europe, contributing prominently to German culture and society.
During The Holocaust many Jews fled Germany to other countries for refuge, and the majority of the remaining population were killed.

The following is a list of some famous Jews (by religion or descent) from Germany proper.

Historical figures

Politicians
 Fischel Arnheim, politician
 Ludwig Bamberger, politician
 Daniel Cohn-Bendit, member of European Parliament, student leader in 1968
 Wilhelm Dröscher, SPD politician
 Kurt Eisner, Bavarian prime minister
 , Mayor of Berlin from 1931 to 1933, (converted to Christianity)
 Heinrich von Friedberg, jurist, statesman (converted to Christianity)
 Karl Rudolf Friedenthal, Prussian politician (converted to Christianity)
 Clement Freud, German-born British MP
 Rudolf Hilferding, Finance Minister in 1923 and from 1928 to 1929
 Alex Himelfarb, ambassador
 Helmut Schmidt, Chancellor of West Germany (1974–1982)
 Henry Kissinger, U.S. Secretary of State, Nobel Prize (1973)
 Ludwig Landmann, mayor of Frankfurt/Main
 Eduard Lasker, co-founder of the National Liberal Party
 Eugen Leviné, Bavarian prime minister
 Jutta Oesterle-Schwerin, Member of parliament, Green party, Feminist party
 Eduard von Simson, President of the Reichstag, President of the Reichsgericht
 Walther Rathenau, Foreign Minister of the Weimar Republic
 Herbert Weichmann, Mayor of Hamburg 1965–1971, president of the German Bundesrat (Federal upper house)
 Marina Weisband, Ukrainian-born former Pirate Party Germany politician
 Jeanette Wolff, West Berlin politician
 Walter Wolfgang, German-born politician

Activists
 Hedwig Dohm-Schleh, feminist, author
 Nahum Goldmann, president of World Jewish Congress
 Amalie Nacken (1855–1940) was a Munich-based philanthropist 
 Josel of Rosheim, court Jew and Jewish advocate
 Paul Spiegel, leader of the Central Council of Jews in Germany
 Sidonie Werner (1860–1932), women's rights activist

Religious figures

Rabbis
 Aaron ben Benjamin Wolf, Chief Rabbi of Berlin (1709)
 Aaron Moses ben Mordecai of East Prussia
 Abraham Auerbach (mid 1700s – November 3, 1846), Alsatian-born rabbi and liturgical poet. Fled France for Germany after imprisonment during the Reign of Terror.
 Ahron Daum, Chief Rabbi of Frankfurt am Main
 Abraham Geiger, founding father of Reform Judaism
 Samson Raphael Hirsch, intellectual founder of the Torah im Derech Eretz school of contemporary Orthodox Judaism
 Immanuel Jakobovits, Chief Rabbi of Great Britain 
 Elijah Loans, rabbi of Fulda, Hanau, Friedberg, and Worms
 Seligmann Meyer, rabbi of Regensburg
 Leopold Zunz (10 August 1794 – 17 March 1886), founder of academic Jewish studies

Reform
 Levi Herzfeld, 19th-century proponent of moderate reform

Other
 Ridley Haim Herschell, missionary
 Joseph Wolff, missionary

Scientific figures

Natural scientists
 Adolf von Baeyer, industrial chemist, Nobel Prize (1905) (Jewish mother)
 Norbert Berkowitz, physicist
 Hans Bethe, nuclear physics, Nobel Prize (1967) (Jewish mother) 
 Sir Walter Bodmer, medical researcher
 Max Born, quantum mechanics, Nobel Prize (1954) (converted to Christianity)
 Heinrich Caro, industrial chemist
 Nikodem Caro, industrial chemist
 Albert Einstein, theoretical physics, Nobel Prize (1921)
 Erwin Finlay-Freundlich, astronomer
 James Franck, quantum physics, Nobel Prize (1925)
 Adolph Frank, industrial chemist
 Herbert Fröhlich, physicist
 Eugen Glueckauf, chemist, expert on atomic energy
 Hans Goldschmidt, industrial chemist
 Fritz Haber, developed the Haber process, Nobel Prize (1918)
 Walter Heitler, chemist
 Arthur Korn, physicist
 Ernst Ising, statistical mechanics
 Albert Ladenburg, chemist
 Fritz London, quantum mechanics
 Leonard Mandel, quantum optics
 Kurt Mendelssohn, German-born British medical physicist
 Viktor Meyer, organic chemist (converted to Christianity)
 Leonor Michaelis, biochemist
 Albert A. Michelson, measured speed of light, Nobel Prize (1907) (Jewish father)
 Ludwig Mond, chemist and industrialist
 Sir Rudolf Peierls, solid state theory
 Arno Penzias, co-discoverer of CMB, Nobel Prize (1978)
 Alfred Philippson, geologist
 John Charles Polanyi, chemist, Nobel Prize (born Berlin) 
 Ernst Pringsheim, spectrometry, black-body radiation
 Michael Rossmann, physicist and microbiologist (Jewish mother)
 Rudolf Schoenheimer, biochemist
 Arthur Schuster, spectroscopist
 Karl Schwarzschild, physicist and astronomer (converted to Christianity)
 Franz Simon, physicist, separation of Uranium 235
 Jack Steinberger, particle physics, Nobel Prize (1988)
 Otto Stern, experimental physicist, Nobel Prize (1943)
 Moritz Traube, biochemist
 Wilhelm Traube, chemist, caffeine/purine synthesis
 Otto Wallach, chemist, Nobel Prize (1910) (converted to Christianity)
 Richard Willstätter, chemist, Nobel Prize (1915)

Physicians and medical researchers
 Adolph Baginsky, pediatrician, diphtheria researcher
 Alfred Bielschowsky, ophthalmologist
 Max Bielschowsky, neuropathologist
 Konrad Bloch, biochemist, Nobel Prize (1964)
 Marcus Elieser Bloch, physician
 Gustav Born, professor of pharmacology
 Edith Bulbring, professor of pharmacy (Jewish mother)
 Sir Ernst Chain, developed penicillin, Nobel Prize (1945)
 Ferdinand Cohn, pioneer in microbiology
 Julius Friedrich Cohnheim, pathologist
 Paul Ehrlich, developed magic bullet concept, Nobel Prize (1908)
 Arthur Eichengrün, possible inventor of aspirin
 Wilhelm Feldberg, biologist
 Heinz Fraenkel-Conrat, biochemist
 Hermann Friedberg, physician
 Salome Gluecksohn-Waelsch, geneticist
 Ernst Gräfenberg, obstetrician, the intrauterine device, the G-spot
 Martin Gumpert, physician, writer
 Friedrich Gustav Jakob Henle, physician (converted to Christianity)
 Sir Bernard Katz, biophysicist, Nobel Prize (1970)
 Hans Kornberg, biochemist researcher
 Hans Kosterlitz, discovered endorphins
 Sir Hans Adolf Krebs, biochemist, Nobel Prize (1953)
 Rudolph Lennhoff, developed the open air cure for tuberculosis
 Fritz Lipmann, biochemist, Nobel Prize (1953)
 Jacques Loeb, physiologist
 Otto Loewi, pharmacologist, Nobel Prize (1936)
 Elisabeth Mann, biologist (Jewish mother)
 Otto Meyerhof, biochemist, Nobel Prize (1922) (Jewish father)
 Oskar Minkowski, physiologist
 Albert Neisser, physician, discovered the cause of gonorrhea (Jewish father)
 Emin Pasha, physician, naturalist, explorer
 Nathanael Pringsheim, botanist
 Ottomar Rosenbach, physician
 Moritz Heinrich Romberg, physician, innovative author in neuroscience
 Selma Schwester, longtime head nurse at Shaare Zedek Hospital, Jerusalem
 Karl Stern, Canadian neurologist, psychiatrist, author
 Rahel Straus (1880–1963), medical doctor and feminist
 Ludwig Traube (1818-1876), medical doctor, introduced regular tracking of vital signs (respiration, temperature, pulse)
 Moshe Wallach, founder and director, Shaare Zedek Hospital, Jerusalem
 Carl Warburg, doctor of medicine and clinical pharmacologist.
 Otto Heinrich Warburg, physiologist, Nobel Prize (1931) (Jewish father)
 Karl Weigert, pathologist

Mathematicians
 Felix Bernstein, set theory (converted to Christianity)
 Maurice Block, statistician
 Richard Brauer, modular representation theory
 Paul Cohn, algebraist
 Richard Courant, mathematical analysis and applied mathematics
 Max Dehn, topology
 Paul Epstein, number theory
 Adolf Fraenkel, set theory
 Hans Freudenthal, algebraic topology
 Friedrich Hartogs, mathematician
 Felix Hausdorff, topology
 Heinz Hopf, topology (Jewish father)
 Adolf Hurwitz, mathematician
 Carl Gustav Jakob Jacobi, analysis
 Leopold Kronecker, number theory
 Edmund Landau, number theory
 Rudolf Lipschitz, mathematician
 Kurt Mahler, mathematician
 Hermann Minkowski, geometrical theory of numbers
 Claus Moser, Statistician
 Leonard Nelson, mathematician, philosopher (converted to Christianity)
 Bernhard Neumann, mathematician
 Emmy Noether, algebra and theoretical physics
 Alfred Pringsheim, analysis, theory of functions
 Richard Rado, combinatorics
 Robert Remak, group theory
 Abraham Robinson, nonstandard analysis
 Arthur Moritz Schönflies, mathematician
 Issai Schur, mathematician
 Reinhold Strassmann, mathematician
 Otto Toeplitz, linear algebra and functional analysis

Technical scientists
 Ralph Baer, inventor of the games console
 Emile Berliner, inventor of the gramophone
 Emanuel Goldberg (1881–1970, from Russia, but published in German), pioneered Microdots and microfilm retrieval technology
 Julius Edgar Lilienfeld, electrical engineer
 Siegfried Marcus, automobile pioneer
 Michael O. Rabin, computer algorithms, Turing Award (1976)
 Reinhold Rudenberg, electrical engineer and inventor,
 Adolf Schallamach, pioneered understanding of friction and wear phenomena in rubber
 Joseph Weizenbaum, AI critic, ELIZA

Psychologists
 Karl Abraham, psychoanalyst
 Rudolf Arnheim, perception theorist
 Erik Erikson, developmental psychologist (Jewish mother)
 Erich Fromm, psychologist and humanistic philosopher
 Erika Fromm, psychologist and co-founder of hypnoanalysis.
 Benedict Friedlaender, sexologist
 Frieda Fromm-Reichmann, psychoanalyst
 Kurt Goldstein, Gestalt-influenced neurologist
 Max Hamilton, psychiatrist
 Magnus Hirschfeld, sexologist
 Kurt Koffka, Gestalt psychologist
 Kurt Lewin, social psychologist
 Hugo Münsterberg, industrial psychologist
 Ulric Neisser, cognitive psychologist (Jewish father)
 Erich Neumann, analytical psychologist
 Fritz Perls, psychotherapist
 Harvey (née Heinz) Schloesser, psychiatrist and psychoanalyst
 Otto Selz, cognitive psychologist
 William Stern, the Intelligence Quotient
 Max Wertheimer, Gestalt psychologist

Academic figures

Philosophers
 Theodor Adorno (1903–1969), philosopher (Jewish father)
 Hannah Arendt, political philosopher
 Leo Strauss, political philosopher
 Ernst Bloch, philosopher
 Constantin Brunner, philosopher
 Ernst Cassirer, philosopher
 Hermann Cohen, philosopher
 Friedrich Dessauer, philosopher
 Max Dessoir, philosopher
 Julius Frauenstädt, philosopher

 Kurt Grelling, philosopher
 Richard Hönigswald (Jewish father)
 Max Horkheimer (1895–1973), philosopher and sociologist
 Edmund Husserl, philosopher (converted to Christianity)
 Hans Jonas, philosopher
 Horace Kallen, philosopher
 Adolf Lasson, philosopher
 Theodor Lessing, philosopher, writer
 Karl Löwith, philosopher
 Salomon Maimon, philosopher
 Fritz Mauthner, author and philosopher
 Moses Mendelssohn, philosopher, scholar
 Helmuth Plessner, philosopher (Jewish father)
 Hans Reichenbach, philosopher (Jewish father)
 Eugen Rosenstock-Huessy, philosopher (Jewish father)
 Max Scheler, philosopher (Jewish mother)
 Edith Stein, philosopher, martyr and saint of the Catholic Church
 Kurt Sternberg, philosopher
 Richard Rudolf Walzer, philosopher (Jewish Year Book 1975 p. 214)

Economists
 Robert Aumann, Nobel Prize for Economics
 Richard Ehrenberg, economist (converted to Christianity)
 Ludwig Lachmann, economist
 Emil Lederer, economist
 Robert Liefmann, economist
 Adolph Lowe, economist
 Rosa Luxemburg, economist, co-founder of the KPD
 Peretz Naftali, economist, editor, later Israeli finance minister
 Sigbert Prais, economist (JYB 2005 p. 215)
 Reinhard Selten, Nobel prize (1994)
 Hans Singer, economist

Social Scientists
 Reinhard Bendix, sociologist
 Eduard Bernstein, founder of evolutionary socialism
 Franz Boas, cultural anthropologist
 Lewis A. Coser, sociologist
 Norbert Elias, sociologist
 Amitai Etzioni, sociologist
 Shelomo Dov Goitein, Arabist
 Moses Hess, socialist
 Eugene Kamenka, sociologist
 Siegfried Kracauer, sociologist and film critic
 Ferdinand Lassalle, founder of first German worker's party
 Karl Mannheim, sociologist
 Herbert Marcuse, sociologist, New Left figurehead
 Karl Marx, founder of Marxism (parents converted to Protestantism)
 Franz Oppenheimer, sociologist and economist
 Leo Loewenthal, sociologist
 Georg Simmel, sociologist
 Georg Steindorff, Egyptologist (Jewish father)
 Jacob Taubes, theologist
 Louis Wirth, sociologist

Historians
 Ernst Bernheim, historian
 Bernhard Brilling (1906-1987), Historian and archivist of German Jewry
 Walter Cahn, art historian
 Colin Eisler, art historian
 Geoffrey Rudolph Elton (son of Victor Ehrenberg) 
 Richard Ettinghausen, art historian
 Henry Friedlander, historian
 Peter Gay, historian
 Heinrich Graetz, historian
 George W. F. Hallgarten, historian
 Eric Hobsbawm, historian
 Isaak Markus Jost, historian
 Ernst Kantorowicz, historian of medieval political and intellectual history
 Richard Krautheimer, historian
 Arno Lustiger, historian
 Lothar Machtan 
 Golo Mann, historian (Jewish mother)
 George Mosse, historian
 Erwin Panofsky, art historian
 Otto Rahn, historian of legends about the holy grail
 Hans Rothfels, historian
 Fritz Stern, historian
 Aby Warburg, art historian
 Rudolf Wittkower, architectural and art historian
 Michael Wolffsohn, historian

Jurists

 Jacob Friedrich Behrend, jurist
 David Daube, Professor of Law
 Heinrich Dernburg, jurist (converted to Christianity)
 Victor Ehrenberg, jurist (converted to Christianity)
 Eugen Ehrlich (converted to Christianity)
 Eduard Gans (converted to Christianity)
 Hugo Haase, jurist
 Franz Haymann, jurist (converted to Christianity)
 Sir Otto Kahn-Freund, Professor of Law
 Julius Anton Glaser (converted to Christianity)
 Georg Jellinek (converted to Christianity)
 Hermann Kantorowicz, jurist
 Walter Kaskel, jurist
 Robert Kempner, jurist
 Paul Laband, jurist, b. Breslau (converted to Christianity)
 Otto Lenel, jurist
 Ernst Levy (jurist)
 Philipp Lotmar
 Kurt May (1896–1992), campaigner on behalf of the victims of Nazism
 Franz Neumann, legal theorist
 Arthur Nussbaum, jurist
 Joseph Süss Oppenheimer, financial planner and court Jew
 Gabriel Riesser, deputy speaker of Frankfurt Assembly in 1848, first Jewish judge in Hamburg
 Rudolf Schlesinger, jurist
 Georg Schwarzenberger, jurist
 Eduard von Simson, President of the Reichstag, President of the Reichsgericht
 Hugo Sinzheimer, legal scholar
 Joseph Unger (converted to Christianity)
 Wilhelm Eduard Wilda (converted to Christianity)
 Sigmund Zeisler, jurist

Linguists and philologists
 Paulus Aemilius, professor of Hebrew
 Theodor Benfey, linguist (converted to Christianity)
 Eduard Fraenkel, philologist
 Wilhelm Freund, philologist
 Ludwig Friedländer, philologist 
 Julius Fürst, orientalist
 Theodor Goldstücker, linguist
 Moshe Goshen-Gottstein, linguist
 Victor Klemperer, linguist and diarist
 Siegbert Salomon Prawer, Professor of German
 Chaim Menachem Rabin, linguist
 Edward Sapir, anthropologist-linguist
 Ernest Simon, professor of Chinese
 Heymann Steinthal, linguist

Educationalists
 Lewis Elton, educationalist 
 Kurt Hahn, educationalist
 Henriette May (1862–1928), German Jewish educator and women's activist

Entertainment

Showbusiness
 Hugo Egon Balder, comedian, producer (Jewish mother),
 Mark Bellinghaus, actor, artist, writer, activist (Jewish mother),
 Ludwig Berger, director
 Lotte Berk, dancer and health guru
 Christian Berkel, actor
 Kurt Bernhardt, director
 Ludwig Blattner: film producer and studio owner, developer of the first magnetic tape recorder.
 Artur Brauner, film producer
 Friedrich Dalsheim, director
 Michael Degen, actor
 Ernst Dohm, actor, editor
 Hedwig Dohm-Pringsheim, actress
 E.A. Dupont, director
 Michel Friedman, TV personality
 Kurt Gerron, stage actor and film director
 Dora Gerson, actress, cabaret singer
 Therese Giehse, actress Pepermill
 Lou Jacobs, clown
 Ludwig Karl Koch, broadcaster and sound recordist
 Werner Klemperer, Movie, TV Hogan's Heroes and Broadway actor, violinist
 Carl Laemmle, film producer
 Robert Lembke, journalist and well-known TV show host (Jewish father)
 Ernst Lubitsch, director
 Jeanine Meerapfel, film director and screenwriter
 Max Ophüls, film director
 Richard Oswald, director
 Ferdinand Eduard Pahnecke, actor
 Lilli Palmer, actress
 Luise Rainer, actress
 Hans Rosenthal, one of Germany's most popular TV personalities in history
 Susan Sideropoulos, actress
 Robert Siodmak, director
 Ruth Westheimer (born 1928), German-American sex therapist, talk show host, author, Doctor of Education, Holocaust survivor, and former Haganah sniper.
 Konrad Wolf, film director
 Peter Zadek, theatre director

Musicians
 Samuel Adler, composer
 Haim Alexander, composer
 Tzvi Avni, composer
 Paul Ben-Haim, composer
 Julius Benedict, composer
 Herman Berlinski, American composer, organist, pianist, musicologist and choir conductor
 Wolf Biermann, singer/songwriter (Jewish father)
 Yehezkel Braun, Israeli composer
 Manfred Bukofzer, musicologist
 Paul Dessau, composer
 Abel Ehrlich, Israeli composer
 Alfred Einstein, musicologist
 Hanns Eisler, German-born composer (Jewish father)
 Lukas Foss, composer and conductor
 Alexander Goehr, composer
 Walter Goehr, conductor
 Berthold Goldschmidt, composer
 Bernard Greenhouse, cellist
 Nina Hagen, German-Jewish origin from her father's side, Punk Rock Singer, she was considered an opera prodigy by the time she was nine. Her paternal grandfather died in the Sachsenhausen concentration camp.
 George Henschel, singer and conductor
 Alfred Hertz, conductor
 André Herzberg, musician (Pankow)
 Ferdinand Hiller, composer, conductor and pianist
 Gerard Hoffnung, musicologist 
 Friedrich Holländer, composer
 Salomon Jadassohn, composer
 Leon Jessel, composer
 Robert Kahn, composer
 Otto Klemperer, conductor
 Robert Lachmann, musicologist
 Ludwig Lenel, organist and composer
 Hermann Levi, conductor
 Alfred Lion and Frank Wulff, founders of Blue Note Records
 Edward Lowinsky, musicologist
 Gustav Mahler, composer
 Michael Mann, musician (Jewish mother)
 Arnold Mendelssohn, organist
 Felix Mendelssohn, composer and conductor (Jewish ancestry but raised Lutheran)
 Fanny Mendelssohn Hensel, composer
 Giacomo Meyerbeer, composer
 Ben-Zion Orgad, Israeli composer
 Menahem Pressler, pianist
 André Previn, conductor
 Franz Reizenstein, pianist, composer
 Curt Sachs, musicologist, co-founder of modern organology
 Kurt Sanderling, conductor
 Adolf Martin Schlesinger, music publisher
 Arnold Schoenberg, composer
 Heinrich Sontheim, tenor
 William Steinberg, conductor
 Erich Walter Sternberg, composer
 Josef Tal, composer
 Ilia Trilling, synagogue composer
 Ignatz Waghalter, composer and conductor
 Bruno Walter, conductor (Jewish father)
 Franz Waxman, film composer
 Kurt Weill, composer
 Indira Weiss, singer and actress
 Hans Winterberg, composer
 Stefan Wolpe, composer
 Alec Empire, member of Atari Teenage Riot
 Hilde Zadek, soprano
 Aron Liedtke, music producer
 Hans Zimmer, film score composer and record producer

Artists
 Anni Albers, textile designer
 Frank Auerbach, painter
 Eduard Bendemann, painter
 Martin Bloch, British painter
 Erwin Blumenfeld, photographer
 Alfred Eisenstaedt, photographer
 Benno Elkan, sculptor
 James Ingo Freed, architect
 Gisèle Freund, photographer
 Eva Hesse, materials artist
 Erich Kahn, painter, expressionist
 Eugen Kaufmann, architect
 Hugo Lederer (1871–1940) sculptor
 Ludwig Levy, architect
 Max Liebermann, painter
 Wilhelm Löwith, artist
 Peter Max, pop artist
 Ludwig Meidner, painter
 Erich Mendelsohn, architect
 Helmut Newton, photographer (Jewish father)
 Felix Nussbaum, painter
 Meret Oppenheim, surrealist
 Erwin Panofsky, art historian
 Martin Erich Philipp, artist
 Hans Schleger, designer
 Charlotte Salomon, artist
 Erich Salomon, news photographer
 Erna Weill, sculptor
 Victor Weisz, Vicky, cartoonist

Other 
 Josef Ganz, car designer
 Siegfried Marcus, car designer
 Edmund Rumpler, Austro-German car designer
 Jacqueline Van Maarsen, author and best friend of diarist Anne Frank 
 Hanneli Goslar, friend of diarist Anne Frank and holocaust survivor
 Sanne Ledermann, friend of diarist Anne frank and holocaust victim

Writers
 Erich Auerbach, literature critic
 Berthold Auerbach, author and poet
 Julius Bab, dramatist and theater critic
 Jurek Becker, writer
 Maxim Biller, writer
 Ludwig Börne, satirist
 Otto Brahm, literary critic
 Henryk Broder, journalist
 Walter Benjamin (1892–1940), literary critic and philosopher
 Emil Carlebach, writer, dissident
 Joseph Derenbourg, orientalist, father of Hartwig Derenbourg
 Hilde Domin, poet
 Lion Feuchtwanger, novelist
 Hubert Fichte, author (Jewish father)
 Anne Frank, diarist
 Karen Gershon (1923–1993), poet  
 Friedrich Gundolf, literary man
 Glückel of Hameln, 18th-century Yiddish diarist
 Maximilian Harden, journalist
 Heinrich Heine, poet (converted to Protestantism for job prospects)
 Stefan Heym, novelist, politician
 Wolfgang Hildesheimer
 Edgar Hilsenrath, novelist
 Daniel Hoffmann, writer and philologist (German Studies)
 Barbara Honigmann, writer
 Heinrich Eduard Jacob, writer and journalist
 Siegfried Jacobsohn, journalist and theater critic
 Ruth Prawer Jhabvala, novelist and screenwriter
 Wladimir Kaminer, short story writer
 Judith Kerr, children's writer
 Victor Klemperer, writer
 Else Lasker-Schüler, writer, poet and artist (converted to Protestantism for job prospects)
 Claire Loewenfeld, writer and herbalist
 Hugo Lubliner, dramatist.
 Emil Ludwig, writer
 Gila Lustiger, author
 Erika Mann, writer, actress (Jewish mother)
 Klaus Mann, writer (Jewish mother)
 Monika Mann, writer (Jewish mother)
 Liselotte Marshall, novelist
 Julius Mosen, born Moses
 Erich Mühsam, anarchist poet
 Henning Pawel, children's author, writer
 Solomon Perel, author
 Marcel Reich-Ranicki, literary critic
 H. A. Rey and Margret Rey, creators of Curious George
 Renate Rubinstein (Jewish father)
 Nelly Sachs, poet, Nobel Prize (1966)
 Anna Seghers, novelist
 Oskar Seidlin, writer
 Rafael Seligmann, writer
 Süßkind von Trimberg, medieval writer, minnesinger
 Kurt Tucholsky, writer (converted to Protestantism)
 Samuel Ullman, poet
 Rahel Varnhagen, writer and saloniste (converted to Christianity)
 Moritz Callmann Wahl
 Jakob Wassermann, novelist
 Trude Weiss-Rosmarin
 Jeanette Wohl
 Victoria Wolff (1903–1992), German born American writer and screenwriter
 Friedrich Wolf, writer, physician
 Carl Zuckmayer, playwright (Jewish mother)
 Arnold Zweig, writer
 Stefan Zweig, novelist, playwright and journalist, best known for his autobiographies
 Hedwig Lachmann, author, translator and poet

Entrepreneurs
See also Court Jews
 Alfred Beit, financier
 Sir Ernest Cassel, banker
 Maurice de Hirsch, banker
 Sir Robert Mayer, German-born businessman and philanthropist
 Israel Jacob (philanthropist) (1729–1803)
 Marcus Goldman (1821–1904), German-born banker, co-founder of Goldman Sachs
 Abraham Kuhn and Solomon Loeb, founders of Kuhn, Loeb & Co.
 Henry Lehman (1822–1855), Emanuel Lehman (1827–1907) and Mayer Lehman (1830–1897), German-born bankers, co-founders of former bank Lehman Brothers
 Joseph Mendelssohn (1770–1848), founder of former bank Mendelssohn & Co.
 Salomon Oppenheim (1772–1828), founder of bank Sal. Oppenheim
 Ernest Oppenheimer (1880–1957), diamond and gold mining entrepreneur and financier who controlled De Beers and founded the Anglo American Corporation of South Africa
 Emil Rathenau (1838–1915), founder of AEG
 Adolf Rosenberger, co-founder of Porsche
 Nathan Mayer Rothschild (1777–1836), founder of British company N M Rothschild & Sons
 Hermann Tietz (1837–1907), founder of Hertie, a department store
 Leopold Ullstein (1826–1899), founder of publishing company Ullstein Verlag
 Moses Marcus Warburg and Gerson Warburg, co-founder of M. M. Warburg & Co., German bank
 Georg Wertheim (1857–1939), founder of former Wertheim, a department store
 Stef Wertheimer "77-year-old German-born Stef Wertheimer"
 Gustav Wilhelm Wolff, founder of Harland and Wolff

Sports

 Alon Abelski, football player
 Rudi Ball, ice hockey player, right wing, Olympic bronze, world runner-up, bronze
 Gretel Bergmann, high jumper
 Hans Berliner, world postal chess champion
 Barney Dreyfuss, co-founder of the World Series
 Alfred Flatow, 3 time Olympic gymnastics champion (parallel bars, team parallel bars, team horizontal bar), silver (horizontal bar)
 Gustav Felix Flatow, 2 time Olympic gymnastics champion (team parallel bars, team horizontal bar)
 Gottfried Fuchs, soccer player, (German national team)
 Ludwig Guttmann, founder of the Paralympics
 Lilli Henoch, world records (discus, shot put, and 4x100-m relay); shot by the Nazis in Latvia
 Fredy Hirsch, sport teacher
 Julius Hirsch, footballer, German champion, killed during the Holocaust
 Bernhard Horwitz, chess player
 Herbert Klein, swimmer, Olympic bronze (200-m breaststroke); 3 world records
 Emanuel Lasker, world chess champion
 Henry Laskau, racewalker, won 42 national titles; Pan American champion; 4x Maccabiah champion
 Helene Mayer, foil fencer (Jewish father), Olympic champion
 Sarah Poewe, swimmer (Jewish mother), Olympic bronze (4x100 medley relay)
 Ellen Preis (Ellen Müller-Preis) (1912–2007), German-born Austrian Olympic champion foil fencer
 Daniel Prenn, tennis player, highest world ranking # 6
 Eugen Sandow, bodybuilding pioneer
 Anton Shynder, football player
 Siegbert Tarrasch, chess player

Military

Literature
 Walter Tetzlaff, ed. "2000 Kurzbiographien bedeutender deutscher Juden des 20. Jahrhunderts" (Lindhorst: Askania, 1982).

See also
 History of the Jews in Germany
 List of Austrians
 List of Austrian Jews
 List of Czech, Bohemian, Moravian and Slovak Jews
 List of Germans
 List of Galician Jews
 Lists of Jews

References

 
Lists of Jews by country
Jews
Jews,German